The GoFly Gotar is a French autogyro that was designed by and was under development by GoFly Aeronatique of Boves, Somme, introduced in 2013. The aircraft was intended to be supplied to customers complete and ready-to-fly.

The company seems to have been founded about 2013 and gone out of business in 2016. It is unclear whether any examples were completed and flown.

Design and development
The Gotar has a fuselage design that can be finished as an autogyro with an unpowered rotor, a helicopter with a powered rotor, or as an ultralight trike with a hang glider-type wing fitted. The autogyro version was developed first and it seems unlikely that other versions were completed.

As an autogyro the Gotar features a single main rotor, a two-seats-in tandem open cockpit with a windshield, tricycle landing gear without wheel pants, plus a tail caster and a four-cylinder, 16 valve, air-cooled, four stroke  Vija J-10Si engine in pusher configuration.

The aircraft fuselage is made from metal tubing, with a small cockpit fairing and a curved windshield that continues over the seats to the rotor mast.

The design was first promoted on the company website in 2013, but had reportedly not flown by 2015. The company website was removed at the end of 2016. The company presumably no longer exists and Gotar development ended.

Specifications (Gotar)

See also
List of rotorcraft

References

External links
Official website archives on Archive.org

Gotar
2010s French sport aircraft
2010s French helicopters
Ultralight trikes
Single-engined pusher autogyros